Ardhanagari (also: Bhatachhari), an abugida, was a mixture of Nagari, used in Malwa, particularly Ujjain, and Siddha Matrika or the Siddham script, a variant of the Sharada script used in Kashmir.

Brahmic scripts
History of Malwa
Linguistic history of India

History of Ujjain